Physocarpus capitatus, commonly called Pacific ninebark or tall ninebark, is a species of Physocarpus in the rose family native to western North America.

Description 
The reddish-gray bark, which is flaky and peels away in many irregular thin layers.

They are deeply veined with double-toothed margins, and are a dark, shiny green on top.

It has clusters of small, creamy white flowers with five petals and numerous red-tipped stamens, which appear in late spring and persist into midsummer.

Etymology 
The common name 'ninebark' comes from the appearance of the flaky bark, seeming to have many layers.

Distribution and habitat 
It is found at low and middle elevations in southern Alaska east to Montana and Utah, and south to southern California. It is most common west of the Cascades and Sierra Nevada, often abundant on the north slopes of coastal mountains. It is less prevalent in the east of its range, where it overlaps with that of the mallow ninebark.

It is often found in wetlands, but also forms thickets along rivers and in moist forest habitats. While it grows most robustly in wet environments, it is drought-tolerant to a degree. It prefers partial shade, but tolerates full sun and is adapted to many different soil types.

Ecology 
Although it has low palatability for browsing ungulates, Pacific ninebark provides good cover and nesting sites for birds and small mammals. The seeds are eaten by birds, and persist in the seed heads until winter.

Toxicity 
Some consider the plant toxic.

Uses 
Pacific ninebark was used as an emetic and a laxative by indigenous groups. The stems were used to make children's hunting bows and small items such as needles; straighter shoots were used to make arrows. The bark was mixed with cedar bark to make a dark brown dye.

It is used in ecological restoration due to its fibrous roots which are good for bank stabilization, and its ability to grow from cuttings. Furthermore, it does not need an overhead canopy to become established at a restoration site as it is tolerant of direct sun. It may grow aggressively enough to shade out invasive species such as reed canary grass and Himalayan blackberry. It is popular in California as a garden plant.

References

Further reading
 Casebeer, M. (2004). Discover California Shrubs. Sonora, California: Hooker Press.

External links

Calflora Database: Physocarpus capitatus (Pacific ninebark, Western ninebark)
Jepson eFlora (TJM2) treatment of Physocarpus capitatus
USDA Plants Profile for Physocarpus capitatus (Pacific ninebark)
 UC Cal Photos gallery of Physocarpus capitatus (Pacific ninebark)

capitatus
Flora of Alaska
Flora of British Columbia
Flora of California
Flora of Idaho
Flora of Oregon
Flora of Washington (state)
Flora of the Cascade Range
Flora of the Klamath Mountains
Flora of the Sierra Nevada (United States)
Natural history of the California chaparral and woodlands
Natural history of the California Coast Ranges
Taxa named by Frederick Traugott Pursh
Garden plants of North America
Flora without expected TNC conservation status